Withrow may refer to:

People with the surname
Alice Withrow (1907–1998), American botanist, and author
Chris Withrow (born 1989), American professional baseball player
Cory Withrow (born 1975), NFL football player  
Gardner Robert Withrow (1892-1964), a former member of the United States House of Representatives
Glenn Withrow (born 1953), American actor
John Jacob Withrow (1833–1900), Canadian businessman and politician
John L. Withrow (1837–1909), American Presbyterian minister 
Mary Ellen Withrow (born 1930), former Treasurer of the United States
William Henry Withrow (1839–1908), a Canadian Methodist minister, journalist, and author

Places

Canada
Withrow, Alberta, a hamlet
Withrow Park, Toronto, Ontario

United States
Withrow Springs State Park in NW Arkansas
Withrow, Minnesota
Withrow, Washington
Withrow Moraine and Jameson Lake Drumlin Field, Douglas County, Washington

See also
Witherow

English-language surnames